Meluk may refer to:

Eduardo Silva Meluk, Colombian football player
Elena Meluk, Russian lash artist